The Indian Doctor is a British television comedy drama, set in the 1960s. Produced by Rondo Media and Avatar Productions, it was first broadcast on BBC One in 2010. The most recent series began on 4 November 2013 on BBC One daytime and concluded on 8 November. It is a period comedy drama starring Sanjeev Bhaskar as an Indian doctor who finds work in a South Wales mining village.

Setting
The first five-part series was broadcast from Monday 15 November to Friday 19 November 2010. Sanjeev Bhaskar stars as Dr. Prem Sharma, the Indian doctor of the title who moves with his wife Kamini Sharma (Ayesha Dharker) to the small Welsh mining village of Trefelin.

The series is based on a true story of culture clash. On a BBC blog site, Sanjeev Bhaskar describes preparing for the role by talking with relatives who lived during the 1960s, but also by having discussions with a doctor, Prem Subberwal, who emigrated from India with his wife Kamini to work as an NHS doctor in a Welsh village. Subberwal explained that one of the major difficulties he had was in understanding and being understood, not because of any difficulty with the English language, but due to the Welsh accent and various colloquialisms that the people used which he, having learned a more formally structured version of English, could not follow.

Plot summary

Series 1
The principal storyline, set in 1963, revolves around the outwardly jolly colliery manager Richard Sharpe and his dark secret: to further his own career, he has deliberately ignored a key mine safety issue to increase coal production. Evidence of this is documented in the previous doctor's diary, and the new Indian doctor gradually becomes determined to reveal the truth.

Subsidiary storylines revolve around the doctor's relationship with Megan Evans, the blossoming love affair between Tom Evans and Gina Nicolli, the theft of charitable funds by miner leader Owen Griffiths, and the truancy (and associated troubles) of Owen's son Dan Griffiths.

Series 2
Now, a year after his arrival, Prem faces a new adversary, evangelist preacher Herbert Todd. When an outbreak of smallpox threatens to bring catastrophe to the village, Prem finds himself fighting prejudice and incompetence and locked in a confrontation with the intransigent Todd for the hearts and minds of the villagers. Also, Prem and his wife Kamini nervously await the arrival of his dreaded mother-in-law, Pushpa. With India gripped by the chaos of a smallpox epidemic, Pushpa is taking the opportunity for a long-overdue inspection of her daughter's new life – and the son-in-law of whom she doesn't approve.

Series 3

It is now 1966, three years after Prem and Kamini's arrival, and they have become very much a part of the Trefelin community. But their lives and those of everyone in the village are about to change when its high-flying 'prodigal sons' return to bring a first real taste of the swinging '60s.

A shiny American sports car zooms into the sleepy Valleys village of Trefelin, carrying with it Basil and Robert Thomas, sons of the old local mine owner. The high-achieving brothers are greeted with joy by everyone from Sian the shopkeeper to the miners in the pub. But for others, like the Indian doctor Prem Sharma, his wife Kamini and newlyweds Emlyn and Megan, the brothers' return spells confusion and frustration as their dreams are dashed and they face the prospect of becoming outcasts once again.

Characters
The other main characters in the series include:
Gina Nicolli (Naomi Everson), the receptionist. (Series 1–2)
Richard Sharpe (Mark Williams), the ruthless colliery manager who runs the mine. (Series 1)
Sylvia Sharpe (Beth Robert), Richard Sharpe's fiery redhead wife. (Series 1)
Megan Evans (Mali Harries), whose miner husband is dying of emphysema.
Tom Evans (Alexander Vlahos), Megan's step-son, who wants to be a professional singer. (Series 1)
Dan Griffiths (Jacob Oakley), a local boy.
Owen Griffiths (Ifan Huw Dafydd), Dan's father – a miner and heavy drinker.
Sian Davies (Erica Eirian), local shop owner.
Ceri Joseph (Dafydd Hywel), local farmer
Sgt Emlyn Dawkins (Alun ap Brinley), local policeman.
Pushpa Bakshi (Indira Joshi), Kamini Sharma's mother. (Series 2)
Rev Herbert Todd (Mark Heap), former missionary, appointed as minister of the chapel. (Series 2)
Basil Thomas (Will Houston), businessman. (Series 3)
Robert Thomas (Rhydian Jones), former doctor. (Series 3)
Mrs. Daniels (Christine Pritchard), receptionist (Series 3)

Episode list

Series 1 (2010)

Series 2 (2012)
Liam Keelan, Controller of BBC Daytime, announced on 25 March 2011 (via the BBC TV blog) that The Indian Doctor had been re-commissioned for a second series. Keelan gave no specifics, but stated that many of the viewers' favourite characters would be returning. Series two was broadcast early in 2012. Series 2 began at 2:15pm on 27 February 2012.

Series 3 (2013)
BBC One commissioned a third series, which was transmitted in the autumn of 2013. This series featured 5x45 min episodes that aired during BBC Daytime and 3x60 min episodes for BBC Wales.

Series 3 (BBC One Wales)

Series 3 (BBC One Daytime)

References

External links

2010s British drama television series
2010 British television series debuts
2013 British television series endings
BBC television dramas
BBC Daytime television series
English-language television shows
Television series set in the 1960s
Fiction set in 1963
Fiction set in 1964
Television shows set in Wales
British Indian mass media